is a Japanese short track speed skater. He competed in the 2018 Winter Olympics.

References

External links
 Official page

1992 births
Living people
Japanese male short track speed skaters
Olympic short track speed skaters of Japan
Short track speed skaters at the 2018 Winter Olympics
Asian Games medalists in short track speed skating
Asian Games bronze medalists for Japan
Short track speed skaters at the 2017 Asian Winter Games
Medalists at the 2017 Asian Winter Games
World Short Track Speed Skating Championships medalists
21st-century Japanese people